The following lists events that happened during 2016 in Azerbaijan.

Incumbents
 President: Ilham Aliyev
 Prime Minister: Artur Rasizade
 Speaker: Ogtay Asadov

January 

 January 20 - National Council of Slovenia recognizes Khojaly Massacre

February 

 February 11 - US State of Nebraska recognized the Khojaly Massacre
 February 15 - US State of Hawaii recognized the Khojaly Massacre
 February 18 - US State of Montana announced "Khojaly Remembrance Day"  
 February 26 - US State of Georgia recognizing Khojaly massacre
 February 26 - US State of Idaho recognized Khojaly massacre

March 

 March 24 - US State of Minnesota accepted a resolution on Khojaly massacre.
 March 29 - Order of the President of Azerbaijan on improving the structure of the Ministry of Culture and Tourism of the Republic.

April 

 April 1–5 - Nagorno-Karabakh clashes

June 

 June 3–4 - Fourth Congress of World Azerbaijanis was held.
 June 15 - Correctional facilities of Azerbaijan starts execution of amnesty act.
 June 19 - European Grand Prix

September 

 September 26 - Azerbaijani constitutional referendum

October 

 October 2 - Visit of Papa Francesco Azerbaijan.

Death 

 Jalal Aliyev - Azerbaijani politician, died in Baku on January 31.
 Ilhama Guliyeva - Azerbaijani People's artist, died of thromboembolism on February 25.
 Zelimkhan Yaqub - died on January 9.

Events
Azerbaijani police used tear gas and water cannons on 15 January on protesters in the Quba District who were protesting the worsening economic situation in the country, leading to the arrest of numerous people.
Azerbaijan will send 30 athletes to compete in the 2016 Summer Olympics in Rio de Janeiro, Brazil from 5–21 August

References

 
2010s in Azerbaijan
Years of the 21st century in Azerbaijan
Azerbaijan
Azerbaijan
Azerbaijan